The Life of the Cosmos is the debut non-fiction book by American theoretical physicist Lee Smolin. The book was initially published on January 1, 1997 by Oxford University Press.

Overview
In the book, Smolin details his Fecund universes which applies the principle of natural selection to the birth of universes. Smolin posits that the collapse of black holes could lead to the creation of a new universe. This daughter universe would have fundamental constants and parameters similar to that of the parent universe though with some changes, providing for both inheritance and mutations as required by natural selection. However, while there is no direct analogue to Darwinian selective pressures, it is theorised that a universe with "unsuccessful" parameters will reach heat death before being able to reproduce, meaning that certain universal parameters become more likely than others.

Review

—Review by Jupiter Scientific

See also
 Quantum mechanics

Related books
 The Trouble With Physics
 Three Roads to Quantum Gravity
 The Road to Reality
 The Elegant Universe
 The Fabric of the Cosmos
 Warped Passages

References

External links

1997 non-fiction books
Books by Lee Smolin
English-language books
Popular physics books